Cymatoderma caperatum is a fungus species in the family Meruliaceae. It was originally described in 1849 as a species of Thelephora by Miles Joseph Berkeley and Camille Montagne. Derek Reid transferred it to Cymatoderma in 1956.

References

Meruliaceae
Fungi described in 1849
Taxa named by Miles Joseph Berkeley